Ben-My-Chree (Manx for "girl of my heart") is a famous former hunting and fishing lodge, steamboat landing and small resort in Northern British Columbia, Canada. It is located at the southwest end of Taku Arm, Tagish Lake in the Atlin District in the extreme northwest of the province, and is closer to the Yukon than the rest of the province.  The Wall Street Crash of 1929 and Great Depression began the resort's decline and it closed in 1956. The site is now a private residence being reclaimed by wilderness.

History
Ben-My-Chree was the destination of a steamer trip from Carcross, Yukon and was originally built by a Mr and Mrs Oscar Partridge who originated on the Isle of Man. It was visited by wealthy socialites during the 1920s. At its height, thousands visited Ben-My-Chree in one year. The resort, which had several buildings, was bought from their estate by the White Pass and Yukon Route then later sold to an American buyer.

References

External links
Irvine, Eric. Story of Ben-My-Chree

Atlin District
Unincorporated settlements in British Columbia
Sports venues in British Columbia